Durden is a surname. Notable people with the surname include:

Benji Durden (born 1951), Boulder, Colorado based coach of elite runners and former distance runner
Jo Durden-Smith (1941–2007), British documentary film maker
Jonathan Durden (born 1957), millionaire, businessman, and journalist from Islington, London
Kent Durden (1937–2007), American wildlife photographer
Mark Durden-Smith (born 1968), British television presenter
Nino Durden (born 1963), officer in the elite Los Angeles Police Department Community Resources Against Street Hoodlums unit
Reggie Durden, former Canadian Football League defensive back
Richard Durden, (born 1944), English actor
Tommy Durden (1919–1999), American steel guitarist and songwriter, co-writer of Elvis Presley's Heartbreak Hotel
William Durden, President of Dickinson College as of July 1, 1999
Tyler Durden (fictional), Founder of an underground fight club that later became a terrorist organization.

See also
Durden Machinery, general engineers to the automotive industry from 1948
Forgive Durden, indie rock band from Seattle, Washington, who got their name from the popular novel, Fight Club
 Dearden